Edwin Robinson (born October 21, 1971) is a presenter and producer on Sky Sports, most notably in the sports channel's boxing programmes. He is a regular on Saturday Fight Night and other boxing broadcasts on Sky Sports & currently fronts the popular weekly Toe 2 Toe internet podcast alongside former professional boxer Spencer Fearon.

Before joining Sky, Edwin worked as a press officer for British boxing promoters Frank Maloney and Frank Warren. Whilst working for Maloney, Edwin boxed three times as a professional, winning two contests and losing one. He was also an amateur boxer for Fitzroy Lodge amateur boxing club in Lambeth, south London.

References

British sports broadcasters
Living people
1971 births